Thomas Harley (born August 19, 2001) is an American-born Canadian professional ice hockey defenseman for the Texas Stars of the American Hockey League (AHL) as a prospect to the Dallas Stars of the National Hockey League (NHL). He was drafted 18th overall by the Stars in the first round of the 2019 NHL Entry Draft.

Playing career

Junior

Mississauga Steelheads
Harley was selected by the Mississauga Steelheads of the Ontario Hockey League in the first round, 14th overall, during the 2017 OHL Priority Draft. In the 2017–18 season, Harley played his first game with the Steelheads on September 22, 2017, earning no points in a 4–3 loss to the Ottawa 67's. Harley earned his first career point, an assist on a goal by Albert Michnac, in a 4–3 loss to the Saginaw Spirit on October 15. Harley scored his first career OHL goal on December 8 against Kai Edmonds of the Barrie Colts in a 3–2 loss. Harley recorded his first OHL career multi-point game on February 23, earning two assists in a 4–0 win over the Niagara IceDogs. In early March, Harley had a three-game point streak, earning four assists in those games. Overall, in 62 games during his rookie season, Harley scored one goal and 15 points. Harley made his post-season debut on March 22, earning no points in a 6–2 win over the Barrie Colts. One week later, on March 29, Harley recorded his first career playoff point, assisting on a goal scored by Cole Carter in a 5–4 loss to the Colts. In six playoff games, Harley earned two assists.

Harley saw much improvement in his second season with the Steelheads in 2018–19. On September 23, Harley recorded his first career three point game, earning three assists in an 8–6 loss to the Niagara IceDogs. Harley would record five more three point games during the season with the Steelheads. On December 31, Harley recorded his first multi-goal game of his OHL career, as he scored two goals against the Windsor Spitfires in a 9–5 victory. In 68 games, Harley scored 11 goals and 58 points. On March 22, Harley recorded his first career multi-point playoff game, earning two assists in a 5–2 loss to the Sudbury Wolves. In four post-season games, Harley earned four assists. Harley was named the winner of the Bobby Smith Trophy, named to the OHL Scholastic Player of the Year. Harley was also named to the OHL Third All-Star Team.

Harley returned to the Steelheads for the 2019–20 season. He opened the season with points in each of his first 10 games, as he scored seven goals and added 10 assists during this streak, earning 17 points. On December 20, Harley scored two goals and two assists, earning his first career four point game, in an 8–2 win over the Barrie Colts. In 59 games, Harley scored a career-high 18 goals and added 39 assists for 57 points.

Professional

Dallas Stars
Harley was selected by the Dallas Stars in the first round, 18th overall, at the 2019 NHL Entry Draft. He was the first player from the Ontario Hockey League selected at the draft. On September 23, 2019, the Stars signed Harley to a three-year, entry-level contract.

Career statistics

Regular season and playoffs

International

Awards and honours

References

External links
 

2001 births
Living people
American men's ice hockey defensemen
Dallas Stars draft picks
Dallas Stars players
Ice hockey players from New York (state)
Mississauga Steelheads players
National Hockey League first-round draft picks
Sportspeople from Syracuse, New York
Texas Stars players